Pennalticola is a monotypic moth genus of the family Noctuidae. Its only species, Pennalticola rectangulum, is found in Myanmar. Both the genus and species were first described by Emilio Berio in 1973.

References

Acontiinae
Monotypic moth genera